Maria Teresa Maia Gonzalez (born 1958) is a Portuguese writer.

She studied in the Faculty of Letters of the University of Lisbon and was a Portuguese teacher from 1982 to 1997. She has published many books, including  Gaspar & Mariana, A Fonte dos Segredos, O Guarda da Praia, O Incendiário Misterioso, Cartas de Beatriz, as well as being the author of the Profissão: Adolescente collection, with 13 books and over 300,000 copies sold. Together with Maria do Rosário Pedreira, she is also a co-author of O Clube das Chaves, a collection with 21 books which has been adapted to a television series. Her most successful book is A Lua de Joana, with 220,000 copies sold (which has been translated into German, Bulgarian, Chinese, Spanish and Albanian).

References 

1958 births
Portuguese women writers
Writers of young adult literature
Living people
People from Coimbra
University of Lisbon alumni
Women writers of young adult literature